Alonso Rael de Aguilar was a high-ranking soldier under Diego de Vargas, serving as Secretary of State and War. Born in February 1661 in Lorca, Murcia, Spain, he arrived in what is now El Paso, Texas by about 1683. He accompanied Diego de Vargas on the 1692 reconquest of the New Mexico Territory for Spain, the anniversary of which is celebrated to this day as the Fiestas de Santa Fe. Rael de Aguilar later served as mayor of Santa Fe. He is the progenitor of the Rael surname throughout the southwest United States of America, notably New Mexico and Colorado.

Rael received a land grant near Cerillos, New Mexico, but apparently abandoned it, and in 1788, the ownership of this grant passed to Rael's granddaughter's husband, Jose Miguel de la Pena. Rael's name also appears twice in the 2001 U.S. General Accounting Office's published report on New Mexican land grants, but the disposition of the grants isn't disclosed in the study.

Jewish Origins

Alonso Rael de Aguilar's departure from Spain "came on the heels of a renewed campaign against crypto-Jews by the Holy Office of Murcia in the early 1680s." The similarities between the surname Rael and the appellation Israel were apparent and, at least locally, connected according to Dr. Stanley Hordes and his research.  For instance, Dr. Hordes discovered that "Alonso's granddaughter María Manuela Rael de Aguilar, a resident of the Río Abajo town of Tomé, is mentioned three times in the baptismal records for 1756 of the nearby mission church of the pueblo of Isleta, as María Manuela Ysrael de Aguilar, an indication that the parish priests, and likely the entire community, were aware of the family's ethnicity," and he discovered that "the connection between the surnames Rael and Israel may be traced back almost three hundred years earlier, to the fifteenth-century..."

External links
Genealogy of Alonso Rael de Aguilar

References

1661 births
1735 deaths
Colonial Mexico
Colonial New Mexico
Spanish colonization of the Americas